Ying-Yi, sometimes called Yingtan after its principal dialect, is one of the Gan Chinese languages. It is named after Yingtan and Yiyang, and is spoken in those areas as well as in Yugan Guixi, Yujiang, Wannian, Leping, Poyang, Pengze, Hengfeng, Chuanshan in Jiangxi province.

Sounds
The Yugan variety of Ying-Yi will be taken as representative.

Consonants

Tones

Citation tones

References

Gan Chinese